Yuan Shanshan (born 22 February 1987) also known as Mabel Yuan is a Chinese actress and singer.
She is noted for her roles as in the Gong series: Palace II (2012) and Palace III (2013); as well as Swordsman (2013) and Jian Bing Man (2015).

Early life and education
Yuan Shanshan was born in a wealthy and highly educated family, to civil servants parents, in Xiangcheng District of Xiangyang city, Hubei province on February 22, 1987. At the age of 6, she started to play the violin.

In 2005, she attended Beijing Film Academy from which she graduated in 2009.

Career
Yuan made her acting debut in A House's Maid in 2010, and was praised by co-star Zhao Wenxuan for her performance.

Yuan Shanshan first came to the attention of the audience when she played a supporting role in the historical television series Qin Xianglian. Under her co-star Leanne Liu's recommendation, she then signed with Yu Zheng's Studio. After guest-starring in Palace, Yuan then got the role of Empress Xiaoshengxian in second installment of Yu Zheng's 'Gong' series; which propelled Yuan to fame and earned her a Breakthrough Improvement award.

Thereafter Yuan starred in several productions by Yu Zheng such as Beauty Without Tears (2012), the third installment of Yu Zheng's 'Beauty' series; Beauty of the Emperor (2012); Swordsman (2013), adapted from Jin Yong's wuxia novel The Smiling, Proud Wanderer; and Palace 3: The Lost Daughter (2014), the sequel of Palace II - all of the series were popular during their run and led to increased recognition for Yuan. She is also known for her role in the period romantic drama Love in Spring (2013). However despite her rising popularity, Yuan faced several backlash by haters on Weibo in regards to her miscast as the role of Ren Yingying in Swordsman.

In 2015, Yuan starred in the superhero parody film Jian Bing Man, which was a box office success and broke ten million admissions. Yuan won the Most Powerful New Actress award at the Weibo Movie Awards Night. She next starred in the South Korean-Chinese romantic comedy film So I Married an Anti-fan and recorded a duet with her co-star Park Chan-yeol from boy band Exo. For the film, Yuan won the Most Popular Actress award at the Chinese American Film Festival.

Filmography

Film

Television series

Discography

Singles

Awards and nominations

References

External links

1987 births
People from Xiangyang
Beijing Film Academy alumni
Actresses from Hubei
21st-century Chinese actresses
Living people
Chinese film actresses
Chinese television actresses